Methantheline is an antimuscarinic.

References

Muscarinic antagonists
Quaternary ammonium compounds
Carboxylate esters
Xanthenes
Abandoned drugs